Ramsen is a municipality in the canton of Schaffhausen in northern Switzerland.

History
Ramsen is first mentioned in 846 as Rammesheim.

Coat of arms
The blazon of the municipal coat of arms is Azure three Ears of Wheat leaved Or issuant from a Mount of the same.

Geography

Of this area, 62.2% is used for agricultural purposes, while 28.9% is forested. Of the rest of the land, 7.3% is settled (buildings or roads) and the remainder (1.6%) is non-productive (rivers or lakes).
The municipality is located in the Stein district which is in the eastern exclave of the canton of Schaffhausen.  It consists of the farming village of Ramsen and several hamlets including Bibermühle and Hofenacker.

Demographics
Ramsen has a population of 1,299, of which 17.4% are foreign nationals.  Of the foreign population,, 59.4% are from Germany, 1.3% are from Italy, 0.4% are from Croatia, 8.5% are from Serbia, 12% are from Macedonia, 0.4% are from Turkey, and 17.9% are from another country.  Over the last 10 years the population has grown at a rate of 6.4%.  Most of the population speaks German (95.6%), with Albanian being second most common ( 1.9%) and French being third ( 0.4%).

The age distribution of the population is children and teenagers (0–19 years old) make up 21.2% of the population, while adults (20–64 years old) make up 59.4% and seniors (over 64 years old) make up 19.4%.

In the 2007 federal election the most popular party was the SVP which received 55.1% of the vote.  The next two most popular parties were the FDP (24.3%), and the SP (20.6%) .

In Ramsen about 76.4% of the population (between age 25-64) have completed either non-mandatory upper secondary education or additional higher education (either university or a Fachhochschule).  In Ramsen, 1.78% of the population attend kindergarten or another pre-school, 8.06% attend a Primary School, 4.11% attend a lower level Secondary School, and 3.56% attend a higher level Secondary School.

, 45.5% of the population belonged to the Roman Catholic Church and 38.6% belonged to the Swiss Reformed Church.

The historical population is given in the following table:

Notable people 
 Mathias Gnädinger (1941–2015)

Economy and Infrastructure
Ramsen has an unemployment rate ( of 1.63%.  , there were 113 people employed in the primary economic sector and about 37 businesses involved in this sector.  111 people are employed in the secondary sector and there are 20 businesses in this sector.  597 people are employed in the tertiary sector, with 69 businesses in this sector.

 the mid year average unemployment rate was 1.4%.  There were 89 non-agrarian businesses in the municipality and 16.7% of the (non-agrarian) population was involved in the secondary sector of the economy while 83.3% were involved in the third.  At the same time, 66.8% of the working population was employed full-time, and 33.2% was employed part-time.  There were 743 residents of the municipality who were employed in some capacity, of which females made up 47.5% of the workforce.   there were 295 residents who worked in the municipality, while 283 residents worked outside Ramsen and 220 people commuted into the municipality for work.

, there are 4 restaurants, and 1 hotel with 36 beds.  The hospitality industry in Ramsen employs 12 people.

Heritage sites of national significance

The manor house Bibernhofgut in the village of Bibermühle is listed as a Swiss heritage site of national significance.

Bibernhofgut is an old manor house along the Rhine River.  The late-Gothic main building was finished in 1529.  The fresco on the south façade, featuring the coat of arms of Stein am Rhein, is from the early 17th Century.  The estate ground also include a water mill.  While the house was owned by the city of Stein am Rhein for centuries, it is currently privately owned.

Ramsen has some fame as the preferred border crossing point for British and Dutch prisoners of war escaping from Germany during the Second World War.

References

Municipalities of the canton of Schaffhausen
Cultural property of national significance in the canton of Schaffhausen